Founded in 1979, American University's Center for Congressional and Presidential Studies (CCPS) serves scholars, students, policymakers and the public by propelling actionable research, providing public education and promoting reasonable democratic commerce. CCPS's faculty, research fellows, executives-in-residence and students have completed hundreds of research projects, which have been broadly disseminated as books, scientific research articles, popular press articles, video documentaries and audio stories. CCPS administers the Campaign Management Institute and the Public Affairs and Advocacy Institute, and publishes the academic journal Congress and the Presidency.  The center has hosted over 350 public symposia and conferences that bring together policymakers, politicos, researchers, journalists, and other public intellectuals to contemplate pressing political and policy issues.

Institutes

Campaign Management Institute: For over two decades, the Campaign Management Institute (CMI) has served as a program designed to train individuals for participation in local, state, and federal political campaigns.

Public Affairs and Advocacy Institute: Modeled on the Campaign Management Institute, the Public Affairs and Advocacy Institute provides students with an intensive exploration of the art and craft of the lobbying profession.

European Public Affairs and Advocacy Institute: A one-week course in Brussels, Belgium that introduces students to lobbying in the European Union.

References 

American University
Research organizations in the United States